"You Gave Me the Answer" is a song by Wings. It was written by Paul McCartney and appeared on the album Venus and Mars.

Origin and recording
McCartney has occasionally paid tribute to his father, James, who led his own band in his youth, by writing "Music Hall numbers." Other such songs from McCartney's catalogue include "When I'm Sixty-Four" and "Honey Pie". To enhance the realism of this period pastiche, McCartney recorded his lead vocals through a filter that removed much of the lower-end frequencies to help emulate the sound of singing through a megaphone, the signature sound of Rudy Vallee, which was a common recording technique during the 1920s, where singers like Vallee and Al Jolson had to compensate for the poor reception of primitive recording equipment at that time.

In concert, McCartney often dedicated this song to Fred Astaire.

Personnel

Paul McCartney – vocals, bass, piano, string arrangement
Jimmy McCulloch – electric guitar
Joe English – drums, backing vocals
Linda McCartney – backing vocals
Tony Dorsey – string arrangement
Michael J. Pierce – clarinet
Vito Platomone – clarinet
Carlos Klejman – violin
Russell Joseph Bobrowski – violin
Ronald B. Benko – trumpet
John K. Branch – viola
Harold Joseph Ballam – bassoon
Bernard S. Richterman – cello

References

1975 songs
Paul McCartney songs
Paul McCartney and Wings songs
Songs written by Paul McCartney
Song recordings produced by Paul McCartney
Music published by MPL Music Publishing